The Illinois River Correctional Institution  is a medium-security state prison for men located in Canton, Fulton County, Illinois, owned and operated by the Illinois Department of Corrections.  

The facility was first opened in 1989, and has a working capacity of 2094.

References

External links 

 John Howard Association monitoring visit, 2012

Prisons in Illinois
Buildings and structures in Fulton County, Illinois
1989 establishments in Illinois